Sadleriana fluminensis is a land snail from the family Hydrobiidae.

Range 
Sadleriana fluminensis occurs in northern Italy, Slovenia, Croatia and Bosnia-Herzegovina. The now scattered occurrences can be interpreted as relics of a contiguous distribution during the last Ice Age, when the Adriatic Sea was partially dried up and the rivers had common lower reaches.

References 

Hydrobiidae
Gastropods described in 1853